Aaduthu Paaduthu is a 2002 Indian Telugu-language romantic comedy film directed by Devi Prasad. The film stars Srikanth, Sunil and Gayatri. The film was a box office success. It is a remake of the Malayalam film Ee Parakkum Thalika (2001).

Cast 

Srikanth as Gopi
 Sunil as Papi
Gayatri as Gayatri / Vasanthi
Brahmanandam as a cop
Dharmavarapu Subramanyam as the sub-inspector
Tanikella Bharani as Gopi's father
M. S. Narayana as the cook
Gautham Raju
 Aditya
 Naveen
 Sathibabu 
 Sana

Production 
Srikanth plays an unemployed youth. Gayatri makes her debuts in Telugu with this film. The film was almost entirely shot in a bus.

Soundtrack 
Music by Chakri.
"Aaduthu Paaduthu" - Ravi Varma, R B Jeeva
"Chamakku Chamakku" - Kausalya
"Navvave Chilakamma" - Pramod Babloo, Santhoshini, Vishwa
"Neeli Neeli" - Hariharan, Kousalya
"Rukumani" – Tippu, Moorthy

Reception
Gudipoodi Srihari of The Hindu gave the film a negative review and opined that "IT HAS been proved time and again that a full-length comedy sans sensible storyline leads nowhere, as is the case with Aaduthoo.. Paaduthoo...". Jeevi of Idlebrain.com said that " Comedy alone cannot save a film when there is no grip on the screenplay. Film is little boring, at times". A critic from Sify wrote that "The film is a full-length comedy and Srikanth and Sunil are average. Newcomer Gayatri Jeyaram has done a good job and she is very confident in the role of Vasanthi. The music of Chakri is average." Arpan Panicker of Full Hyderabad opined that "But carried away by the enthu, he [Devi Prasad] loses track of what he was trying to do in the first place, and the result makes the viewer introspect for traces of masochism".

Box office 
The film had an average box office run and was Srikanth's second consecutive box office hit after O Chinadana (2002).

References

Telugu remakes of Malayalam films
Films scored by Chakri
2000s Telugu-language films